Gunnar Nielsen (23 June 1919 – 9 January 2009) was a Swedish film actor. He appeared in more than 20 films between 1942 and 2000.

Selected filmography
 My People Are Not Yours (1944)
 A Ship to India (1947)
 How to Love (1947)
 Thirst (1949)
 The Hard Game (1956)
 A Lion in Town (1959)

References

External links

1919 births
2009 deaths
Swedish male film actors
Male actors from Stockholm